Boulogne-Billancourt (often colloquially called simply Boulogne, until 1924 Boulogne-sur-Seine) is a wealthy and prestigious commune in the western suburbs of Paris, France, located  from the centre of Paris. It is a subprefecture of the Hauts-de-Seine department and thus the seat of the larger arrondissement of Boulogne-Billancourt. It is also part of the Métropole du Grand Paris. Boulogne-Billancourt includes two large islands in the Seine: Île Saint-Germain and Île Seguin. With a population of 121,334 as of 2018, it is the most populous commune in Hauts-de-Seine and most populous suburb of Paris, as well as one of the most densely populated municipalities in Europe.

Boulogne-Billancourt is one of the wealthiest regions in the Parisian area and in France. Formerly an important industrial site, it has successfully reconverted into business services and is now home to major communication companies headquartered in the Val de Seine business district.

Etymology
The original name of the commune was Boulogne-sur-Seine (meaning "Boulogne upon Seine").

Before the 14th century, Boulogne was a small village called Menuls-lès-Saint-Cloud (meaning "Menuls near Saint-Cloud"). In the beginning of the 14th century, King Philip IV of France ordered the building in Menuls-lès-Saint-Cloud of a church dedicated to the virgin of the sanctuary of Boulogne-sur-Mer, then a famous pilgrimage center in northern France. The church, meant to become a pilgrimage centre closer to Paris than the distant city of Boulogne-sur-Mer, was named Notre-Dame de Boulogne la Petite ("Our Lady of Boulogne the Minor"). Gradually, the village of Menuls-lès-Saint-Cloud became known as Boulogne-la-Petite, and later as Boulogne-sur-Seine.

In 1924, Boulogne-sur-Seine was officially renamed Boulogne-Billancourt to reflect the development of the industrial neighbourhood of Billancourt annexed in 1860.

As for the name Billancourt, it was recorded for the first time in 1150 as Bullencort, sometimes also spelled Bollencort. It comes from Medieval Latin cortem, accusative of cors, meaning "enclosure", "estate", suffixed to the Germanic patronym Buolo (meaning "friend, brother, kinsman"), thus having the meaning of "estate of Buolo".

History

On 1 January 1860, the City of Paris was enlarged by annexing neighbouring communes. On that occasion, the communes of Auteuil and Passy were disbanded and divided between Boulogne-Billancourt (then called Boulogne-sur-Seine) and the city of Paris. Boulogne-sur-Seine received a small part of the territory of Passy, and about half of the territory of Auteuil (including the area of Billancourt, which belonged to the disbanded commune of Auteuil).

Some of the shooting events of the 1900 Summer Olympics took place in Boulogne-Billancourt.

In 1929, the Bois de Boulogne, which was hitherto divided between the communes of Boulogne-Billancourt and Neuilly-sur-Seine, was annexed in its entirety by the city of Paris. On that occasion, Boulogne-Billancourt, to which most of the Bois de Boulogne belonged, lost about half of its territory.  Since then, Boulogne-Billancourt has been surrounded to the west, south and east by the Seine and to the north and north-east by the 16th arrondissement of Paris.

Boulogne-Billancourt is known for being the birthplace of three major French industries. It was the location, in 1906 for the very first aircraft factory, that of Appareils d'Aviation Les Frères Voisin, which was then followed by those of many other aviation pioneers, and the tradition continues with several aviation related companies still operating in the area.

The automobile industry had a large presence with Renault on Île Seguin, as well as Salmson building both cars and aircraft engines. Finally, the French film industry started here and, from 1922 to 1992 it was the home of the Billancourt Studios, and since becoming a major location for French film production. It was used as the setting of the TV show Code Lyoko.

Demographics

Urbanism 

 The ecologic neighbourhood of the Trapèze in Boulogne-Billancourt: the district stands on 74 hectares and will be able to house up to 18,000 inhabitants at the end of its construction. 65% of the district's energy is brought by geothermal power, which heats and freshens the buildings. Solar panels and a vegetable greenhouse were installed in the aim to link the district to sustainable energies. Bicycle and "soft" travels will of course be put first to reduce the pollution caused by cars, as well as other vehicles which do not run on electricity.
 The Ambroise Paré Hospital is located in the city.

Administration
With the city of Sèvres, Boulogne-Billancourt is part of the communauté d'agglomération Val de Seine.

Transport
Boulogne-Billancourt is served by two stations on Paris Métro Line 10: Boulogne–Jean Jaurès and Boulogne–Pont de Saint-Cloud. It is also served by three stations on Paris Métro Line 9: Marcel Sembat, Billancourt and Pont de Sèvres.

Politics
Boulogne-Billancourt is represented by two constituencies and therefore two Members of Parliament.

Economy
Boulogne-Billancourt hosts the global headquarters of several multinational companies, including:
 Alcatel-Lucent
 Boursorama
Carrefour
Française des Jeux
Pika Édition
Renault
TF1 (TF1 Tower)
Vallourec
Yoplait

Prior to 2000 Schneider Electric's head office was in Boulogne-Billancourt.

Main sights

 The Musée Albert-Kahn at 14, Rue du Port, Boulogne-Billancourt is a national museum and includes four hectares of gardens, joining landscape scenes of various national traditions. The museum also includes historic photographs and film.
 The Musée des Années Trente is a museum of artistic and industrial objects from the 1930s.

Education
The public collèges (middle schools) in the commune include Jacqueline-Auriol, Bartholdi, Paul-Landowski and Jean-Renoir. The public high schools are the Lycée Jacques-Prévert and the Lycée Polyvalent Étienne-Jules-Marey. Prior to the September 1968 opening of Prévert, the first high school/sixth-form in Boulogne, an annex of Lycée La Fontaine served the city.

The private school Groupe Scolaire Maïmonide Rambam covers maternelle through lycée. There is also the private high school Notre-Dame. The latter's performance and ranking in Boulogne-Billancourt are given by its success of baccalaureate rate in different series. According to the ranking of L'Express in 2015, the national rank of Notre-Dame de Boulogne was 170 out of 2301 and 7 out of 52 at department level. The private schools Dupanloup and Saint-Joseph-du-Parchamp serve maternelle through collège. Private maternelle and élémentaire schools include Saint-Alexandre and Saint-François d’Assise. Jardin de Solférino and La Maison de l'Enfant are private maternelles.

The Association Eveil Japon (エベイユ学園 Ebeiyu Gakuen), a supplementary Japanese education programme, is located in Boulogne-Billancourt. A campus of the École supérieure des sciences commerciales d'Angers is also located in the city.

Notable people
Boulogne-Billancourt was the birthplace of:
 Pape Badiane (1980–2016), basketball player
 Pierre Bellemare (1929–2018), actor and writer
 Pierre Bleuse (born 1977), music conductor
 Bertrand Blier (born 1939), screenwriter and film director; son of Bernard Blier
 Hubert Le Blon (1874–1910), automobilist and pioneer aviator
 Christophe Boltanski (born 1962), writer and journalist
 Booba (born 1976), rapper
 Daniel Buren (born 1938), conceptual artist
 Guillaume Canet (born 1973), actor, screenwriter and director
 Leslie Caron (born 1931), film actress and dancer
 Benjamin Castaldi (born 1970), TV presenter and producer; son of actor Jean-Pierre Castaldi, former husband of fellow TV presenter Flavie Flament
 Matthieu Chedid (born 1971), composer, singer, guitarist; son of fellow singer and composer Louis Chedid and grandson of writer and poet Andrée Chedid
 Michel Combes (born 1962), French businessman;  the current CEO of Alcatel-Lucent
 Guillaume Connesson (born 1970), composer
 Jean-François Copé (born 1964), politician
 Édith Cresson (born 1934), politician, former Prime Minister of France under the presidency of François Mitterrand
 Xavier de Roux (born 1940), politician
 Michel Deville (born 13 April 1931), screenwriter and film director
 Françoise Deslogères (born 1929), ondist
 Laurent Garnier (born 1966), electronic music producer and DJ
 Anna Gavalda (born 1970), novelist
 Hippolyte Girardot (born 1955), actor
 André Glucksmann (1937–2015), political philosopher and writer
 David Hallyday (born David Smet, 1966), composer, pop rock singer; son of singers Johnny Hallyday (born Jean-Philippe Smet) and Sylvie Vartan, brother of actress Laura Smet, cousin of actor Michael Vartan
 Raphaël Hamburger, (born 1981), music supervisor, son of singers Michel Berger (born Michel Hamburger) and France Gall
 Raphaël Haroche, (born 1975), singer, songwriter and actor
 Sébastien Akchoté-Bozović, known mononymously as Sebastian (born 1981), electronic music producer and DJ;
 Jacques Huntzinger (born 1943), ambassador
 Henri Kagan (born 1930), chemist
 Jean Keraudy (1920-2001) prison escape artist
 Keny Arkana (born 20 December 1982), Argentinian-French rapper and co-founder of the social movement La Rage du peuple
 Sandrine Kiberlain (born 1968), actress; wife of fellow actor Vincent Lindon
 Louise L. Lambrichs (born 1952), novelist and screenwriter
 Gérard Lanvin (born 1950), actor
 Corinne Lepage (born 1951), politician
 Marc Levy (born 1961), novelist
 Thierry Lhermitte (born 1952), actor, co-writer (usually with the band of the Splendid), director, producer
 Nicolas Mahut (born 1982), tennis player
 Patrick Modiano (born 1945), writer, winner of the 2014 Nobel Prize in Literature
 Nelson Monfort (born 1954), television presenter, translator, sports commentator for French public television
 Thibault de Montaigu (born 1978), writer and journalist
 Roger Monteaux (born 1879), actor
 Joachim, 8th Prince Murat (born 1944), aristocrat
 Charles, Prince Napoléon (born 1950), aristocrat and descendant of Jerome Bonaparte
 Bulle Ogier (born Marie-France Thielland, 1939), actress
 Florence Parly (born 1963), politician, Minister of the Armed Forces
 Claude Pinoteau (born 1925), actor, director, writer and producer
 François Polgár (born 1946), choir conductor
 Jérôme Pradon (born 1964), stage actor
 Jean-François Ricard (born 1956), prosecutor of the National Terrorism Prosecution Office for the prosecution of terrorism in France
 Thierry Roland (1934–2012), football specialist, sports journalist, television commentator and presenter
 Baron Edmond James de Rothschild (1845–1934), philanthropist and activist for Jewish affairs
 Véronique Sanson (born 1949), singer
 Alain Sarde (born 1952), former actor, now writer and producer
 Catherine Spaak (born 1945), actress
 Agnès Spaak (born 1944), actress
 Georgette Tissier (1910–1957), actress
 Marie Trintignant (1962–2003), actress
 Gaspard Ulliel, (1984-2022), actor, model
 Michael Vartan (born 1968), French-American actor
 Marin de Viry (born 1962), writer
 Zazie (Isabelle de Truchis de Varennes, born 1964), singer-songwriter
 Prince Lorenz of Belgium Archduke of Austria-Este, Prince Royal of Hungary (born 1955)

International relations

Boulogne-Billancourt is twinned with:

 Anderlecht, Belgium
 Hammersmith and Fulham (London), England, United Kingdom
 Neukölln (Berlin), Germany

 Marino, Italy
 Pančevo, Serbia
 Ra'anana, Israel
 Irving, United States
 Sousse, Tunisia

See also

Communes of the Hauts-de-Seine department
Alcatel-Lucent
AC Boulogne-Billancourt
Boulogne-Billancourt Half Marathon
Raymond Couvègnes

References

External links

 Site officiel de Boulogne-Billancourt  
 Page Facebook de Boulogne-Billancourt 
 Compte Twitter de Boulogne-Billancourt 
 History of Billancourt 

Arrondissement of Boulogne-Billancourt
Cities in Île-de-France
Communes of Hauts-de-Seine
Subprefectures in France
Venues of the 1900 Summer Olympics
Olympic shooting venues
Cities in France